Wieczorek (archaic feminine: Wieczorkowa, plural Wieczorkowie) is one of the most common surnames in Poland, and the second most common in Opole Silesia (2,654) and Świętokrzyskie (2,654). In Polish name mean “little evening”. Notable people include:

 Adam Wieczorek (born 1992), Polish mixed martial artist 
 Andreas Wieczorek (born 1974), German football midfielder
 Antoni Wieczorek (1924-1992), Polish ski jumper
 Bertram Wieczorek (born 1951), German physician and former politician
 Burghild Wieczorek (1943-2016), East German athlete
 Christian Wieczorek (born 1985), German football player
 Danuta Dudzińska-Wieczorek (born 1966), Polish opera singer
 Denis Wieczorek (born 1991), German figure skater
 Eva Janina Wieczorek (born 1951), Polish visual artist
 Greg Wieczorek, American drummer
 Heidemarie Wieczorek-Zeul (born 1942), German politician
 Henryk Wieczorek (born 1949), Polish football player
 Kamila Wieczorek (born 1997), Polish ice hockey forward
 Kristin Wieczorek (born 1986), German figure skater
 Mariusz Wieczorek, Polish canoeist
 Max Wieczorek (born 1939), Canadian rower
 Raymond Wieczorek (born 1928), American Republican politician
 Raymond Wieczorek Drive
 Ryszard Wieczorek (born 1962), Polish football player and manager
 Teodor Wieczorek, Polish football player and manager
 Teresa Ciepły née Wieczorek (1937–2006), Polish sprinter and hurdler

Polish-language surnames
Surnames of Silesian origin